Nwangele is a Local Government Area of Imo State, Nigeria. The name was derived from the popular Nwangele river which marks the boundary between Amaigbo and Umuozu Isu. The river which is believed to have originated from Isiekenesi town passes through several villages in Amaigbo and empties into Oramiriukwa a tributary of Imo river. Its headquarter is in Amaigbo.

It is made up of ten autonomous communities which include Abajah, Amaigbo, Umunakara, Umuozu, Dim Na Nume, Umudurunna Abba, Ogwuaga Abba, Ekitiafor Abba, Umuopara Abba, etc. The postal code of the area is 471. Nwangele is represented in the Imo State House of Assembly by Rt. Hon. Amara Chyna Iwuanyanwu who doubles as the Deputy Speaker of the House.

Economic activities 
The people of Nwangele are predominantly domiciled in different parts of the world contributing to the world economy as business and educated professionals. On the other hand, people at home are farmers who also trade in various farm products such as cassava, fufu, garri, palm oil, palm kernel, and are skilled in local crafts such as brooms, baskets.

Geographical Location 

Nwangele is strategically located along the Ihiala Orlu Anara road. It shares boundaries on the north with Nkwerre Local Government Area, on the South with Isiala Mbano Local Government, on the East with Ideato-South and Onuimo Local government Areas and on the West with Isu Local Government Area.

References 

Local Government Areas in Imo State
Local Government Areas in Igboland
Towns in Imo State